This is the complete list of Basilicas in India. Basilica is a title given to some Catholic churches. By canon law no Catholic church can be honoured with the title of basilica unless by apostolic grant or from immemorial custom. The title is bestowed upon large churches that are important as places of pilgrimage or for a specific devotion such as to a saint. Basilicas in this canonical sense are divided into major ("greater") and minor basilicas. Today only four, all in Rome, are classified as major basilicas:  the major basilicas of St John Lateran,  St Peter,  St Paul outside the Walls, and  St Mary Major. The other canonical basilicas, including all the basilicas in India are minor basilicas.

There are 28 basilicas in India, of which 23 are of the Latin Church, 4 are of the Syro-Malabar Catholic Church and 1 is of the Syro-Malankara Catholic Church. The state of Kerala has 10 basilicas, including all 5 non-Latin Church basilicas, while Tamil Nadu has 7 basilicas and Karnataka has 4. All the remaining basilicas are the only ones in their respective states or union territories. India is the country with the most basilicas in Asia.

List of basilicas

See also
List of cathedrals in India
Roman Catholicism in India
List of Roman Catholic dioceses in India
List of Catholic bishops of India
List of Catholic Churches in India

References

External links 
List of Indian basilicas from GCatholic.org
List of all Basilicas in India from Notes on India

 
India
Basilicas